Bal Kumar Patel (born 1 January 1964) is an Indian politician and has served as a member of the 15th Lok Sabha of India. He represented the Mirzapur constituency of Uttar Pradesh and was a member of the Samajwadi Party (SP) political party before he joined Indian National Congress in March 2019. He is the brother of bandit Dadua and uncle of Veer Singh Patel, former MLA of Chitrakoot.

Early life and education
Bal Kumar Patel was born in Devkali village, Chitrakoot district, Uttar Pradesh on 1 January 1964 to Ram Pyare Patel and Krishnawati Patel. Bal Kumar had a brother Shiv Kumar Patel (Dadua) who was killed by Uttar Pradesh Police in July 2007.

Bal Patel was educated at Bhauri Intermediate College, Chitrakoot, Uttar Pradesh. Highest qualification attained by him is Intermediate (12th). He was an agriculturist and businessperson before joining politics.

Personal life
Bal Kumar Patel married Rambai Patel on 2 February 1980 and the couple have 1 daughter and 3 sons. 

One of his son Ram Singh Patel is the present MLA from Patti (Pratapgarh district).

Politics
Two years after the death of his brother Dadua, Bal Kumar Patel successfully contested the Lok Sabha elections from Mirzapur in 2009 as Samajwadi Party candidate. In his election affidavit of 2009, he had 10 criminal cases upon him.

Positions held

See also

List of members of the 15th Lok Sabha of India
Politics of India
Parliament of India
Government of India

References 

India MPs 2009–2014
Living people
1964 births
Samajwadi Party politicians
People from Mirzapur district
People from Chitrakoot district
Lok Sabha members from Uttar Pradesh
People from Mirzapur
Indian National Congress politicians